Unbound Group, formerly Electra Private Equity, is a British-based online company specialising in clothing and specialist footwear. Listed on the London Stock Exchange until 2022, it is listed on the Alternative Investment Market.

History
The company was founded by Michael Stoddart in 1976 as Electra Investment Trust. In 1999 3i made an unsuccessful hostile bid to take over the company. In 2005, Electra Partners Europe completed a spinout from its investment trust parent.  The following year, in 2006, Electra Partners Europe renamed itself Cognetas.

In August 2021, the company announced that, following the spin-off of its hospitality business Hostmore plc, it would rename itself Unbound Group and transfer to the Alternative Investment Market. This took effect on 1 February 2022. The company subsequently converted to being a retailer of clothing and specialist footwear.

Activities
Since February 2002, the company has focused on the sale of clothing and specialist footwear.

References

External links
Official Unbound website
Yahoo Profile: Electra Private Equity
Hemscott Profile: Electra Private Equity

British companies established in 1976
Companies formerly listed on the London Stock Exchange
Companies listed on the Alternative Investment Market